American Gothic is an American mystery drama television series created by Corinne Brinkerhoff. CBS announced a 13-episode straight-to-series order on October 9, 2015. The show premiered on June 22, 2016. On October 17, 2016, CBS cancelled the series after one season.

Plot
The Hawthornes, an affluent Boston family, must redefine themselves following the discovery that their recently deceased patriarch could have been a serial killer. Suspicion arises that one of them may have been his accomplice.

Cast and characters

Main
 Juliet Rylance as Alison Hawthorne-Price the bisexual eldest sister of the family who is running for mayor
 Antony Starr as Garrett Hawthorne the mysterious prodigal eldest brother who has returned from a 14-year absence
 Micheal Doonan as Young Garrett Hawthorne
 Justin Chatwin as Cameron "Cam" Hawthorne the younger brother, a cartoonist and recovering drug addict, and husband of Sophie and father of Jack
 Megan Ketch as Tessa Ross the younger sister and wife of Brady
 Elliot Knight as Brady Ross a police officer for the Boston Police Department and husband of Tessa
 Stephanie Leonidas as Sophie Hawthorne Cam's wife and the mother of Jack
 Gabriel Bateman as Jack Hawthorne the psychopathic son of Cam and Sophie
 Virginia Madsen as Madeline Hawthorne, wife of Mitch and mother of Alison, Garrett, Tessa, and Cam

Recurring
 Enrico Colantoni as Mayor Conley, the incumbent candidate Alison is running against in the upcoming election, a former safety inspector
 Jamey Sheridan as Mitch Hawthorne, husband of Madeline, father of Alison, Garrett, Tessa, and Cam
 Dylan Bruce as Tom Price, Alison's husband
 Maureen Sebastian as Naomi Flynn, Alison's campaign manager and lover
 Deirdre Lovejoy as Detective Linda Cutter, Brady's superior and the lead investigator on the re-opened SBK case
 Catalina Sandino Moreno as Christina Morales, a doctor and the daughter of SBK's final victim
 Teresa Pavlinek as Dana, a medical examiner who works with Brady and Detective Cutter
 Sarah Power as Jennifer Windham, a television reporter
 Natalie Prinzen-Klages and Nora Prinzen-Klages as Harper and Violet Hawthorne-Price, daughters of Alison and Tom

Reception
American Gothic  holds a current score of 51 out of 100 on Metacritic based on 23 "mixed or average" reviews. The review aggregator website Rotten Tomatoes reports a 58% critics rating based on 24 reviews. The website consensus reads: "American Gothic may not be striving for much, yet it holds promise as a soapy, campy family murder-mystery that's ultimately just engaging enough."

Episodes
Each episode of the series is named after a well-known American work of art, and features a visual reference to its namesake painting within the episode.

References

External links
 
 

2010s American drama television series
2010s American mystery television series
2010s American police procedural television series
2016 American television series debuts
2016 American television series endings
CBS original programming
English-language television shows
Gothic television shows
Television series by Amblin Entertainment
Television series by CBS Studios
Television shows directed by Steph Green
Television shows set in Boston
Television series about dysfunctional families
Fictional portrayals of the Boston Police Department
Television shows about drugs